Ana Raquel Pérez Galindo (born 9 October 1978) is a Spanish field hockey player who competed in the 2004 Summer Olympics.

Notes

References

External links
 
 
 

1978 births
Living people
Spanish female field hockey players
Olympic field hockey players of Spain
Field hockey players at the 2004 Summer Olympics
Field hockey players from Madrid